Đặng Thị Tèo (born 19 July 1968) is a Vietnamese long-distance runner. She competed in the women's marathon at the 1992 Summer Olympics, but did not finish the race.

References

External links
 

1968 births
Living people
Athletes (track and field) at the 1992 Summer Olympics
Vietnamese female long-distance runners
Vietnamese female marathon runners
Olympic athletes of Vietnam
Place of birth missing (living people)
Athletes (track and field) at the 1994 Asian Games
Asian Games competitors for Vietnam
21st-century Vietnamese women